Luis Fernando Macias Hernandez (born May 14, 1982 in Lagos de Moreno, Jalisco) is a Mexican former professional cyclist. He won the Mexican national under-23 time trial championships in 2005. He returned to Mexico in 2006, after racing in Spain in 2004 and 2005, to compete for the Continental team Chivas Cycling Team and a year later Tecos-Trek. In 2008 he was the Mexican road race champion and won the silver medal in the road race at the Pan American Cycling Championships.

After the disbanding of the Tecos-Trek team in late 2009, for the 2010 season he signed with the American team . The team had requested a position as a Professional Continental but was refused and was eventually downgraded to amateur. Macías competed for the team at the Vuelta Mexico Telmex and won the fourth stage. At the end of the year, he left the team and joined the Mexican team Canel's Turbo, also amateur, and competed in the Vuelta a Guatemala.

Major results

Road

2003
 1st  Time trial, National Under-23 Road Championships
2004
 7th Coppa Citta di Asti
2006
 3rd Road race, National Road Championships
2007
 1st Stage 11b Vuelta a Cuba
2008
 1st  Road race, National Road Championships
 1st Stage 6 Vuelta a Chihuahua
 2nd  Road race, Pan American Road Championships
2009
 1st Stage 6 Vuelta a Puebla
 1st Stage 2 Vuelta a Oaxaca
2010
 1st Stage 4 Vuelta Mexico Telmex
 3rd  Road race, Central American and Caribbean Games
2011
 1st Stage 9 Vuelta a Chiriquí
 5th Road race, Pan American Road Championships
2012
 1st Clasica León-San Luis
2014
 1st Stage 3 Ruta del Centro

Track

2002
 1st  Madison, Central American and Caribbean Games
2006
 1st Six Days of Aguascalientes (with Franco Marvulli)
 1st Six Days of Mexico (with Franco Marvulli)
2009
 1st  Madison, Pan American Track Championships
2010
 Central American and Caribbean Games
2nd  Madison
3rd  Team pursuit
2014
 1st  Team pursuit, National Track Championships
 3rd  Points race, Central American and Caribbean Games

External links
 

Living people
Mexican male cyclists
1982 births
Competitors at the 2002 Central American and Caribbean Games
Competitors at the 2014 Central American and Caribbean Games